is an arcade game spin-off of the survival horror video game series Silent Hill developed by Konami Digital Entertainment and published by Konami. The Arcade was first revealed at the 2007 Japan Arcade Operator's Union trade show by Konami.

Being a rail shooter, Silent Hill: The Arcade is a large departure from the normal survival horror mechanics of the main series.

Plot
Silent Hill: The Arcade deals with two characters, Eric and Tina, who have entered the town of Silent Hill and must battle monsters while uncovering the mystery behind Eric's nightmares about a girl and a steamship.

Gameplay
The gameplay in Silent Hill: The Arcade is similar to the House of the Dead series in which players use light guns to aim and shoot at enemies. Shooting away from the screen reloads the player's gun.

The Arcade has a multiplayer element, where each player can choose to be either Eric or Tina. A second player can join the game at any time. Progress can be saved by using the e-Amusement pass.

Characters

Eric: The protagonist of the story. A quiet, inquisitive 21-year-old college student currently studying the occult, he is a resident of Portland. As a child, he used to live in Silent Hill but moved. He has lived with his aunt and uncle since his parents died. His grandfather, the captain of the Little Baroness, disappeared on Toluca Lake so Eric has taken an interest in investigating the rumors circulating around the area.

Tina: Another protagonist of the story, Tina is also 21 and lives in Portland. An outgoing, optimistic character, she is a college student studying to become a teacher. She has come to Silent Hill to meet her pen-pal Emilie.

Bill: A friend of Eric and Tina. At the beginning of the game he is wounded by monsters and not seen again.

Jessie: Another friend of Eric and Tina that travels with them to Silent Hill. She disappears after the attack on Bill, but can be found in the hospital, after a fight with Pyramid Head in the Otherworld.

Emilie: The 9-year-old daughter of the Silent Hill Historical Societies' chief librarian and a friend of Tina's. She is seen throughout the gameplay running from ferocious attackers.

Hanna: Born in 1910, she is a sickly girl resented by her mother. As a result, she dies in the accident on the Little Baroness. She is the antagonist in the game and is mutated into a creature with only a head and tentacles. After she is defeated, she reverts to her original form and is saved by Eric before she departs with the Little Baroness in the good ending.

Other characters include members of the school's occult club that came to Silent Hill with Eric and Tina. After they go missing, the player is tasked with saving them to get the best ending possible.

Reception
The game was given a negative review by Destructoid who regarded it as "an extremely unnecessary spin on the classic survival horror series".

References

External links
Official website (archived) 

2007 video games
Arcade video games
Arcade-only video games
Cooperative video games
Konami arcade games
Konami games
Light gun games
Silent Hill games
Video games set in Maine
Video games developed in Japan